Eucithara gibbosa is a small sea snail, a marine gastropod mollusk in the family Mangeliidae.

Not to be confused with Eucithara gibbosa Hedley, 1922 (which is a synonym of Eucithara novaehollandiae (Reeve, 1846)

Description
The length of the shell attains 8 mm, its diameter 4.5 mm.

The smooth whorls are nodulous at the shoulder. The ribs are slightly flexuous. The color of the shell is ashy white, encircled by faint orange-brown lines, the back stained with pale black at the upper part.

Distribution
This marine species occurs off the Philippines and off Australia (Queensland, Western Australia).

References

 Reeve, L.A. 1846. Monograph of the genus Mangelia. pls 1-8 in Reeve, L.A. (ed). Conchologia Iconica. London : L. Reeve & Co. Vol. 3.
 Boettger, O. 1895. Die marinen Mollusken der Philippinen. IV. Die Pleurotomiden. Nachrichtsblatt der Deutschen Malakozooligischen Gesellschaft 27(1-2, 3-4): 1-20, 41-63

External links
  Tucker, J.K. 2004 Catalog of recent and fossil turrids (Mollusca: Gastropoda). Zootaxa 682:1-1295
 Kilburn R.N. 1992. Turridae (Mollusca: Gastropoda) of southern Africa and Mozambique. Part 6. Subfamily Mangeliinae, section 1. Annals of the Natal Museum, 33: 461–575

gibbosa
Gastropods described in 1846